The 2011 Seguros Bolívar Open Bucaramanga was a professional tennis tournament played on hard courts. It was the third edition of the tournament which was part of the 2011 ATP Challenger Tour. It took place in Bucaramanga, Colombia between 24 and 30 January 2011.

ATP entrants

Seeds

 Rankings are as of January 17, 2011.

Other entrants
The following players received wildcards into the singles main draw:
  Gastão Elias
  Alejandro Falla
  Sebastian Serrano
  Eduardo Struvay

The following players received entry from the qualifying draw:
  Júlio César Campozano
  Iván Endara
  Pablo Galdón
  Fernando Romboli

Champions

Singles

 Éric Prodon def.  Fernando Romboli, 6–3, 4–6, 6–1

Doubles

 Juan Sebastián Cabal /  Robert Farah def.  Pablo Galdón /  Andrés Molteni, 6–1, 6–2

External links
Official Website
ITF Search
ATP official site

Seguros Bolivar Open Bucaramanga
Hard court tennis tournaments
Tennis tournaments in Colombia
Seguros Bolívar Open Bucaramanga
2011 in Colombian tennis